Glascock is a surname. Notable people with the surname include:

Aaron Glascock, sound editor
Brian Glascock (born 1948), drummer
Darrell Glascock (born 1946), American media consultant
David Glascock (1885–1969), American basketball coach
John Glascock (1951–1979), British musician
John R. Glascock (1845–1913), American politician
Kathryn Irene Glascock (1901–1923), American poet
Thomas Glascock (1790–1841), American politician, soldier and lawyer
William Glascock (1730–1793), American politician
William Nugent Glascock (c.1787–1847), British naval officer and novelist

See also
Glascock County, Georgia
Glascock Prize
Glasscock (disambiguation)